The 2014 CONCACAF Women's Championship, the ninth edition of the CONCACAF Women's Championship/Gold Cup/Women's World Cup qualifying tournament, was a women's soccer tournament that took place in the United States between 15 and 26 October 2014. It served as CONCACAF's qualifier to the 2015 FIFA Women's World Cup. The top three teams qualified directly. The fourth placed team advanced to a play-off against the third placed team of the 2014 Copa América Femenina.

The qualifying to the tournament was organized by the Central American Football Union (UNCAF) in Central America and the Caribbean Football Union (CFU) in the Caribbean and started on 19 May 2014.

The United States and Mexico received byes into the tournament. A total of 30 teams entered qualifying, with Martinique and Guadeloupe not eligible for World Cup qualification as they are only members of CONCACAF and not FIFA. Therefore, a total of 28 teams were in contention for the three direct places plus the play-off place against CONMEBOL's Ecuador. Canada did not participate as they already qualified to the World Cup as hosts.

The United States defeated Costa Rica 6–0 in the final to win their seventh title.

Qualifying

North America
North American Football Union members Mexico and the United States gained direct entry to the final tournament. Canada did not participate as they already qualified to the World Cup as hosts.
 (2010 Runner-up)
 (Host, 2010 Third place)

Central America
The qualification was played between 19 and 25 May.
 (Group 1 winner)
 (Group 2 winner)

Caribbean
The inaugural Women's Caribbean Cup served as the qualifying event. Four nations advanced to the CONCACAF finals. Qualifying to the Caribbean Cup took place from 23 May to 22 June. The finals were played in August 2014. The group stage draw was published in April 2014.
 (Group A runner-up)
 (Group A winner)
 (Group B runner-up)
 (Group B winner)

Final tournament
Eight teams were divided in two groups and play a round-robin tournament. The top two placed teams advanced to the semifinals. The losers of those semifinals played in the third place match, while the winners faced off in the final. The top three placed teams qualified directly to the 2015 FIFA Women's World Cup.

However, as Martinique is not a member of FIFA – since it is an overseas department of the French Republic –  it is therefore not eligible to qualify. It was announced during the Final Draw on September 5 that Martinique would not be able to advance beyond the group round, and that the next best team would take their place in the semifinals should they finish in the top two in their group.

Venues
The tournament was played in four venues.

RFK Stadium, Toyota Park and Sporting Park hosted group stage matches, while PPL Park hosted the semifinals, the third-place match and the final.

Squads

Group stage
The teams are ranked according to points (3 points for a win, 1 point for a tie, 0 points for a loss). If tied on points, tiebreakers are applied in the following order:
Greater number of points in matches between the tied teams.
Greater goal difference in matches between the tied teams (if more than two teams finish equal on points).
Greater number of goals scored in matches among the tied teams (if more than two teams finish equal on points).
Greater goal difference in all group matches.
Greater number of goals scored in all group matches.
Drawing of lots.

Group A

Group B

Knockout stage
In the knockout stage, if a match is level at the end of normal playing time, extra time is played (two periods of 15 minutes each) and followed, if necessary, by penalty shoot-out to determine the winner.
The top three teams qualified directly to the 2015 FIFA Women's World Cup. The fourth placed team advanced to a play-off against the third placed team of the 2014 Copa América Femenina.

Bracket

Semifinals
Winners qualified for the 2015 Women's World Cup.

Third place match
Winner qualified for the 2015 Women's World Cup. Loser entered CONMEBOL–CONCACAF play-off.

Final

Awards
The following awards were given at the conclusion of the tournament.

Goalscorers
7 goals
 Abby Wambach

5 goals
 Carli Lloyd

4 goals
 Carolina Venegas
 Charlyn Corral

3 goals

 Raquel Rodríguez
 Donna-Kay Henry
 Stephany Mayor
 Mónica Ocampo
 Kennya Cordner

2 goals

 Shakira Duncan
 Christina Murray
 Luz Duarte
 Tobin Heath
 Christen Press

1 goal

 Wendy Acosta
 Shirley Cruz Traña
 Fabiola Sanchez
 María Monterroso
 Lindsay Zullo
 Alexa Allen
 Prisca Carin
 Alina Garciamendez
 Dinora Garza
 Teresa Noyola
 Tanya Samarzich
 Maylee Atthin-Johnson
 Lauryn Hutchinson
 Mariah Shade
 Morgan Brian
 Whitney Engen
 Meghan Klingenberg
 Sydney Leroux
 Megan Rapinoe

1 own goal
 Johanne Guillou (playing against Mexico)

References

External links
World Cup Qualifying – Women, CONCACAF.com

 
2014–15 in CONCACAF football
2015 FIFA Women's World Cup qualification
2014
2014
2014 in American women's soccer
2014 in women's association football
October 2014 sports events in the United States